UD Collerense is the women's football section of UD Collerense. The club is located in Palma de Mallorca (Balearic Islands, Spain).

History
The team was created in 1999. Starting in the third tier, in 2002 it reached the second category where it played for the seven next seasons, usually ranking in its group's top positions.

In the 2008-09 season Collerense won all 26 matches, qualifying for the first time for the promotion play-offs six weeks before the end of the regular season. In the play-offs the team defeated Oiartzun KE (4–1) and UD Tacuense (1–0) to become the first Balearic team to play in the league's top level.

In its first two seasons in the Superliga, which coincided with a reform in the competition's system, Collerense was respectively 5th and 6th in the first stage's group B and 2nd in the second's stage group C, qualifying both times for the national cup, where it was knocked out in the first round by FC Barcelona (2–1, 0–2) and Atlético Madrid (0–1, 1–3) respectively. Following the league's reunification the team was 14th in the 2011–12 season, with a 4 points advantage over relegation positions.

The reserve team currently plays in the third tier after being relegated in 2011.

Titles
 Promotion to the Superliga Femenina: 2008-09
 Primera Nacional (T2)
 Winners 2008-09: 1
 Runners-up 2003-04, 2004–05, 2005–06, 2007-08: 4
 Regional (T3)
 Winners 2001–02: 1

Season to season

Current squad

References

External links
 Collerense squad (FFIB)
 Ten things you did not know about UD Collerense. La Liga (in Spanish)

Women's football clubs in Spain
Association football clubs established in 1999
1999 establishments in Spain
Sport in Palma de Mallorca
Football clubs in the Balearic Islands
Segunda Federación (women) clubs
Primera División (women) clubs